Julije Kempf (25 January 1864 – 6 June 1934) was a Croatian historian and writer. Kempf was born in Požega, Slavonia. After graduating from Požega gymnasium, he attended teachers school in Zagreb. Afterwards, he worked in Novi Vinodolski as a teacher, before returning to Požega in 1885 to teach in Elementary school for boys.

Soon he became well known for his efforts to make lessons more interesting for pupils, while adhering to scientific principles and didactic methods. Kempf supported founding of, and eventually presided over Požega valley teachers' association, finally becoming a member of Union of Croatian teachers' associations. Thanks to his reputation, Kempf became headmaster of the Elementary school for boys in Požega in 1902. In 1917, thanks to many of his professional achievements, Kempf was appointed Royal county school superintendent, a function he held until 1925. In 1925, Kempf became mayor of Požega, and he served his city in that way for four years.

Kempf travelled throughout Croatia, many other parts of then Austria-Hungary, Germany, Italy, Bosnia-Herzegovina, Montenegro and Romania. His literary works, "From Sava to Adria through Bosnia and Herzegovina" (1898), "Along the coast of Adria" (1902), "From Požega valley" (1914), "Around Psunj mountain" (1924), "Topusko spa" (1929), and many others, bear witness that Kempf had systematically noted his travels. Kempf wrote prefaces for two books of letters he had received from Dragutin Lerman while Lerman was in Africa. These books were "Letters from Africa from Dragutin Lerman" (1891) and "New letters from Africa from Dragutin Lerman" (1894), and represent conscious effort to give readers, especially citizens of Požega, an insight into faraway continent.

His most important work is "Požega, geographic notes from the area and articles of history of free and royal city of Požega and Požega county", published in 1910.

In 1910 Kempf was first to be named honorary citizen of Požega. After his retirement from professional career, he became even more socially active. He was active participant of various societies and associations such as "Croatian reading room", "Požega valley teachers' association", "Volunteer Firefighter Association of Požega", Croatian Singing Association "Vijenac", "Mountaineer Association" and many others.

His particular contribution to the cultural life of Požega was founding of Educational-cultural committee in 1924, and most notably, founding of City museum. At first, the exhibits collected for City museum were stored in franciscan abbey in Požega, until there was more permanent solution. Finally, the City museum opened on 19 October 1930 in old county hall of the County palace, with Kempf as its first curator and principal.

Sources
Kempf, Julije 

1864 births
1934 deaths
Croatian educators
Croatian male writers
20th-century Croatian historians